Puntius thermalis is a species of ray-finned fish in the genus Puntius from Sri Lanka.

References 

thermalis
Taxa named by Achille Valenciennes
Fish described in 1844
Barbs (fish)